3rd Reserve Division() was formed in August 1955 in Chengdu Military Region. On February 15 1956, the division moved to Chengdu, Sichuan.

As of its activation the division was composed of:
7th Reserve Regiment;
8th Reserve Regiment;
9th Reserve Regiment;
Artillery Regiment;
Anti-Aircraft Artillery Regiment;
Sergeant Training Regiment.

The division was fully manned and equipped. During its short-lived existence the division was focused on the training of officers and sergeants.

In March 1958 the division was disbanded.

References

Codification Committee of the Annals of Sichuan Province, Sichuan Shengzhi Junshizhi [Annals of Sichuan Province - Military Annals], Chengdu, Sichuan People's Publishing House, 1999, p.85

R03
Military units and formations established in 1955
Military units and formations disestablished in 1958
Reserve divisions of the People's Liberation Army